Vyacheslav Ivanovich Erbes (born 14 January 1988) is a Kazakh footballer who last played for FC Makhtaaral in the Kazakhstan First Division.

Career statistics

International

Statistics accurate as of match played 3 March 2010

Honours

Club
 Astana
 Kazakhstan Cup (1): 2010

References

External links
 

1988 births
Living people
Kazakhstani footballers
Kazakhstan international footballers
Kazakhstan under-21 international footballers
Kazakhstan Premier League players
FC Astana players
FC Shakhter Karagandy players
FC Vostok players
Sportspeople from Oskemen
Association football midfielders